Henry VI ( – 5 June 1288) was Count of Luxembourg and Arlon from the death of his father, Henry V the Blond, in 1281 until his own death at the battle of Worringen, seven years later, when he was succeeded by his son, Henry VII.

Life 
Henry was the son of Henry V the Blond and Margaret of Bar. His father took part in Saint Louis's crusade against Tunis and he continued this war, being killed alongside three of his brothers at the Battle of Worringen by a knight of John I, Duke of Brabant.

Issue 
Henry married Beatrice d'Avesnes (d. 1 March 1321, daughter of Baldwin and granddaughter of Bouchard IV of Avesnes) around 1260–1 and they had three sons, two of whom attained the highest honours and excellence:

 Henry VII, who was elected King of the Romans in 1308 and Holy Roman Emperor in 1309
 Walram, Lord of Dourlers, Thirimont, and Consorre, died at the siege of Brescia in 1311
 Margaret, Prioress of Marienthal
 Felicitas, Lady of Gaesbeck
 Baldwin, Archbishop-Elector of Trier

Notes

Sources

External links

 , thePeerage.com
 , thePeerage.com
 , thePeerage.com

Attribution
 

House of Luxembourg
Counts of Luxembourg
1240 births
1288 deaths
Year of birth uncertain